Trichrysis is a genus of cuckoo wasps, insects in the family Chrysididae.

Description
The body is elongated. The posterior margin of the third tergite of the abdomen shows three small wide teeth.

Species
Species within this genus include:  
 Trichrysis baratzensis  Strumia, 2010
 Trichrysis cyanea  (Linnaeus, 1758) 
 Trichrysis lacerta  (Semenov, 1954)

References

Chrysidinae
Hymenoptera genera